Winburn may refer to:

Winburn, Lexington, a neighborhood in Lexington, Kentucky, United States

People with the surname
Anna Mae Winburn (1913–1999), American jazz singer and bandleader
Ernie Winburn (1897–1953), American football player
Roland Winburn (born 1946), American politician
Patrick Winburn (born 1955), biographer of Winburn family lineage: William Wenbourne, Puritan Ancestor of Wenbourne, Winborne and Winburn in America